Tuluwat Island (formerly Indian Island or Gunther Island) is located on Humboldt Bay within the city of Eureka, California. The 1860 Wiyot Massacre was perpetrated in the village of Tolowot or Tuluwat on this island. A National Historic Landmark encompasses the midden at Gunther Island Site 67. Since October 21, 2019, the Wiyot people have had the land deed to most of the Island.

Geography
The island is the largest of three islands located between the Samoa and Eureka Channels within Humboldt Bay and primarily consists of tidal marsh. Over time, human habitation on the island changed its topography, in part due to a process known as shell mounding, which increased the elevation of the island as Wiyot continually placed shells remaining from subsistence fishery management in the same location over a period of centuries.

History

Early history
The indigenous Wiyot lived in Tolowot village on Duluwat Island long enough to alter the topography by the accumulation of shell fragments in middens, and the island became tall enough to be visible on the horizon from several miles away.

A non-degree student and employee of the University of California, Llewellyn Lemont Loud (1879-1946), conducted archaeological excavations of the island in 1918 that showed evidence of habitation since around 900 CE. The group of artifacts he excavated and described became known as the Gunther Pattern or Gunther Phase which encompasses the final phase of native dominance lasting until historic times and describes a style of Native American projectile points, grave goods and other archaeological remains which identify a second migration within California around 300 CE. The first major evidence of this came from Gunther Island Site 67 on Indian Island.

1860 massacre

On February 26, 1860, about two hundred Wiyot people, mainly women and children, were massacred while most of the men were away during a World Renewal Ceremony. The massacre was carried out by European immigrants, who had settled in the area since 1850 as part of the California Gold Rush. There were few survivors.

European settlement
Robert Gunther acquired the island in 1860, three days before the massacre, giving it the name it had for much of recent history. Gunther diked the island and ran dairy cattle there for nearly 40 years.

In the 1870s a shipyard repair facility was constructed. The shipyard operated until the 1980s.

Modern era
In 1971 Caltrans built a series of bridges (known collectively as the Samoa Bridge), which cross Humboldt Bay and now directly connect the city of Eureka with the peninsula. Two of these bridges have footings on Tuluwat Island.

Every year since 1992, the Wiyot people and supporters come to the island on the last Saturday in February to heal the community, and remember the human lives lost at the time of the Massacre. Every year participation has increased at the vigil on a nearby island.

In June 2004,  of land was repatriated back into Wiyot hands. The city of Eureka, California, transferred the area towards the Wiyot's goal to see the Wiyot dance the World Renewal ceremony again on the island.

The city of Eureka and the Wiyot Tribe have installed a temporary erosion control system to mitigate erosion on the site. Contamination from the shipyard activities will need to be cleaned up prior to the development of a new Wiyot dance facility.

On December 5, 2018, the Eureka City Council voted unanimously to return the rest of the land to the Wiyot people. On October 21, 2019, the city deeded all its land on the island to the Wiyot people, which means that the Wiyot own most of the island. Duluwat Island's repatriation is believed to be the first time for a U.S. municipality to return land to an Indigenous community without strings attached.

References

External links
The Indian Island Cultural and Environmental Restoration Project 
Map of Island

Additional references

Islands of California
Islands of Humboldt County, California
Wiyot tribe
Bald Hills War
Eureka, California
History of Humboldt County, California
Native American history of California
Archaeological sites on the National Register of Historic Places in California
Islands of Northern California
National Register of Historic Places in Humboldt County, California